Green Man is the debut solo album from English singer-songwriter Mark Owen. The album was released through RCA and BMG on 2 December 1996, months after the official split of his former boyband, Take That. The album was recorded at Abbey Road Studios in London. Three singles were released from the album: "Child", "Clementine" and "I Am What I Am". The album peaked at number 33 on the UK Albums Chart. The album was re-released in 2003 - with the revised title of The Green Man (Repackaged) - following the success of his second studio album, In Your Own Time which had been released earlier that year. Green Man has been certified gold by the British Phonographic Industry (BPI) for shipments of 100,000 copies in the United Kingdom.

Green Man was written entirely by Mark Owen himself (except for two tracks): "The easiest option for Mark Owen who came out of Take That was to get some other people to write some nice catchy pop tunes, and maybe I could have done that for a couple of years. Then I probably would have been hated by everybody and fell by the wayside. But there wouldn’t have been an album unless I’d written it and it had come from me and I felt like it was my album. That’s all I was interested in."

Unlike the dance-pop music of his former group Take That, Green Man sees Owen develop a sound influenced by Britpop and other forms of alternative rock. Working with alternative rock producer John Leckie, the album has been described as having an "attractive sheen" that "sounds like a cross between Radiohead and the Stone Roses", two bands that Leckie had worked with. The album has also been described as an indie pop album. Owen's former Take That bandmate Robbie Williams would also pursue a Britpop-influenced direction on his debut album Life thru a Lens (1997).

Track listing

Charts and certifications

Charts

Certifications

References

External links
 

1996 debut albums
Albums produced by John Leckie
Albums produced by Craig Leon
Britpop albums
Mark Owen albums
Bertelsmann Music Group albums